The first election to Causeway Coast and Glens District Council, part of the Northern Ireland local elections on 22 May 2014, returned 40 members to the newly formed council via Single Transferable Vote. The Democratic Unionist Party won a plurality of first-preference votes and seats.

Election results

Districts summary

|- class="unsortable" align="centre"
!rowspan=2 align="left"|Ward
! % 
!Cllrs
! %
!Cllrs
! %
!Cllrs
! %
!Cllrs
! %
!Cllrs
! %
!Cllrs
! %
!Cllrs
! %
!Cllrs
!rowspan=2|TotalCllrs
|- class="unsortable" align="center"
!colspan=2 bgcolor="" | DUP
!colspan=2 bgcolor="" | UUP
!colspan=2 bgcolor=""| Sinn Féin
!colspan=2 bgcolor=""| SDLP
!colspan=2 bgcolor="" | TUV
!colspan=2 bgcolor="" | Alliance
!colspan=2 bgcolor="" | PUP
!colspan=2 bgcolor="white"| Others
|-
|align="left"|Ballymoney
|bgcolor="#D46A4C"|33.1
|bgcolor="#D46A4C"|3
|16.7
|2
|18.9
|1
|5.9
|0
|17.9
|1
|3.7
|0
|0.0
|0
|3.8
|0
|7
|-
|align="left"|Bann
|29.1
|2
|bgcolor="40BFF5"|30.5
|bgcolor="40BFF5"|2
|15.1
|0
|13.3
|1
|8.4
|0
|3.6
|0
|0.0
|0
|0.0
|0
|5
|-
|align="left"|Benbradagh
|12.7
|0
|0.0
|0
|bgcolor="#008800"|49.5
|bgcolor="#008800"|3
|18.2
|1
|19.6
|1
|0.0
|0
|0.0
|0
|0.0
|0
|5
|-
|align="left"|Causeway
|bgcolor="#D46A4C"|31.2
|bgcolor="#D46A4C"|2
|25.6
|2
|0.0
|0
|9.4
|1
|10.1
|1
|10.5
|1
|0.0
|0
|13.2
|0
|7
|-
|align="left"|Coleraine
|bgcolor="#D46A4C"|33.2
|bgcolor="#D46A4C"|2
|18.0
|2
|5.8
|0
|11.0
|1
|5.0
|0
|6.2
|0
|11.8
|1
|9.0
|0
|6
|-
|align="left"|Limavady
|bgcolor="#D46A4C"|40.2
|bgcolor="#D46A4C"|2
|15.4
|1
|21.3
|1
|15.4
|1
|5.9
|0
|0.0
|0
|0.0
|0
|1.8
|0
|5
|-
|align="left"|The Glens
|7.6
|0
|10.4
|1
|bgcolor="#008800"|35.2
|bgcolor="#008800"|2
|18.7
|1
|3.5
|0
|2.0
|0
|0.0
|0
|22.6
|1
|5
|- class="unsortable" class="sortbottom" style="background:#C9C9C9"
|align="left"| Total
|27.0
|11
|17.1
|10
|19.9
|7
|12.7
|6
|10.4
|3
|3.9
|1
|1.7
|1
|7.3
|1
|40
|-
|}

District results

Ballymoney

2014: 3 x DUP, 2 x UUP, 1 x Sinn Féin, 1 x TUV

Bann

2014: 2 x UUP, 2 x DUP, 1 x SDLP

Benbradagh

2014: 3 x Sinn Féin, 1 x TUV, 1 x SDLP

Causeway

2014: 2 x DUP, 2 x UUP, 1 x TUV, 1 x Alliance, 1 x SDLP

Coleraine

2014: 2 x DUP, 2 x UUP, 1 x PUP, 1 x SDLP

Limavady

2014: 2 x DUP, 1 x Sinn Féin, 1 x UUP, 1 x SDLP

The Glens

2014: 2 x Sinn Féin, 1 x SDLP, 1 x UUP, 1 x Independent

* Incumbent

Changes during the term

† Co-options

‡ Changes of affiliation 

Last updated 24 March 2019.

References

2014 Northern Ireland local elections
21st century in County Antrim
21st century in County Londonderry
Elections in County Antrim
Elections in County Londonderry